Douglas Aurélio (born 27 March 1999) is a Brazilian footballer who plays as a forward for the Latvian club Riga.

Club career
Aurélio made his professional debut with Belenenses SAD in a 5–1 Primeira Liga loss to Vitória S.C. on 12 May 2019.

On 23 June 2021, he moved to Pafos in Cyprus.

On 3 February 2023, Riga announced the singing of Aurélio.

References

External links

ZeroZero Profile

1999 births
Living people
Sportspeople from Minas Gerais
Brazilian footballers
Association football forwards
Belenenses SAD players
G.D. Estoril Praia players
Pafos FC players
Primeira Liga players
Cypriot First Division players
Brazilian expatriate footballers
Expatriate footballers in Portugal
Brazilian expatriate sportspeople in Portugal
Expatriate footballers in Cyprus
Brazilian expatriate sportspeople in Cyprus